Neqarechi Mahalleh (also Romanized as Neqārechī Maḩalleh; also known as Neqārehchī and Neqārehchī Maḩalleh) is a village in Esbu Kola Rural District, in the Central District of Babol County, Mazandaran Province, Iran. At the 2006 census, its population was 1,067, in 267 families.

References 

Populated places in Babol County